Lemley Campus Established in 1965, the Lemley Campus consists of 10 buildings with  of classrooms, laboratories and shops on a  site.  Lemley campus is the largest of Tulsa Technology Center campuses in Tulsa, OK.

Program areas (full-time)
 Advertising Design (B)
 Apparel Design (B)
 Automotive Refinishing Technology (B)
 Automotive Service Technology (B)
 Electrical/Electronics Systems
 Engine Performance
 Heating & Air Conditioning
 Brakes
 Suspension & Steering
 Manual Drive Train
 Business & Marketing (B)
 Business Management/Entrepreneurship (B)
 Carpentry Technology (B)
 Collision Repair Technology (B)
 Culinary Arts Technology (B)
 Dental Assistant (A)
 Dental Assisting (HS)
 Drafting (B)
 Electrical Technology (B)
 Graphics & Imaging Technologies (B)
 Heating, Ventilation, Air Conditioning/Refrigeration Technologies (B)
 Interior Design (B)
 Masonry Services (B)
 Medical Assistant (A)
 Medical Assisting (HS)
 Medium & Heavy Duty Truck Service Technology (B)
 Nursing & Health-Related Options (B)
 Photography Technology (B)
 Practical Nursing (A)
 Pre-Engineering Technology (HS)
 Sports Medicine & Therapeutic Care (HS)
 Surgical First Assistant (A)
 Surgical Technology (A)
 Technical Drafting & Design (B)
 Transitional Career Education Program (TCEP) (HS)
 Vision Care Technology (B)
 Welding Technology (B)

A = Adult students only
B = Both high school & adult students
HS = High school students only

Vocational education in Oklahoma
Education in Tulsa, Oklahoma
Buildings and structures in Tulsa, Oklahoma
1965 establishments in Oklahoma
Educational institutions established in 1965